Tim Saunders (born December 19, 1962) is a Philadelphia-based broadcaster. He is the radio announcer for the Philadelphia Flyers.

Career
Saunders has called games for the Flyers since 1997 replacing John Wiedeman. He is also the former voice of the Camden Riversharks baseball team. He currently works with Steve Coates as his color commentator. Baseball was one of Tim's favorite sports while as a kid. In addition to the Flyers and Riversharks, Saunders was the director of broadcasting and play-by-play voice of the International Hockey League's Cleveland Lumberjacks. His other jobs included games for the Tulsa Oilers for the Central Hockey League and the Muskegon Fury and is originally from Grosse Pointe, Michigan.

Saunders has been a resident of Somerdale, New Jersey.

References

External links
http://articles.philly.com/1997-08-28/sports/25566475_1_broadcasts_gene_hart_foster_hewitt
http://www.riversharks.com/news_id=849
http://www.sc4.edu/show.php?...
http://www.southjersey.com/articles/?articleid=20295

1962 births
Living people
American sports announcers
Baseball announcers
National Hockey League broadcasters
People from Grand Rapids, Michigan
People from Somerdale, New Jersey
Philadelphia Flyers announcers